Nadjmeddin Farabi (5 December 1933 – 9 June 2019) was an Iranian athlete. He competed in the men's decathlon at the 1956 Summer Olympics.

References

External links
 

1933 births
2019 deaths
Athletes (track and field) at the 1956 Summer Olympics
Iranian decathletes
Olympic athletes of Iran
Place of birth missing